Tolentino is a town and comune of about 19,000 inhabitants, in the province of Macerata in the Marche region of central Italy.

It is located in the middle of the valley of the Chienti.

History

Signs of the first inhabitants of this favorable and fertile coastal zone, between the mountains and the Adriatic, date to the Lower Paleolithic.

Numerous tombs, from the 8th to the 4th centuries BCE, attest to the presence of the culture of the Piceni at the site of today's city, Roman Tolentinum, linked to Rome by the via Flaminia. Tolentinum was the seat of the diocese of Tolentino from the late 6th century, under the patronage of the local Saint Catervo. The urban commune is attested from 1099, assuming its mature communal form between 1170 and 1190, settling its boundaries through friction with neighboring communes like S. Severino and Camerino. From the end of the 14th century, the commune passed into the hands of the da Varano family and then the Sforza, before becoming part of the Papal States until the arrival of Napoleon.

The Treaty of Tolentino between Bonaparte and Pope Pius VI was signed in the city on 19 February 1797: this imposed territorial and economic strictures on the Papacy.

In 1815, at the battle of Tolentino, Joachim Murat was decisively defeated by Frederick Bianchi at the head of Austrian forces, resulting in his abdication. Tolentino returned to papal control until Italian unification in 1861.

In the late 19th century industrial development decisively linked Tolentino economically to the rest of Italy.

Geography
The municipality borders with Belforte del Chienti, Camporotondo di Fiastrone, Colmurano, Corridonia, Macerata, Petriolo, Pollenza, San Ginesio, San Severino Marche, Serrapetrona, Treia and Urbisaglia.

Frazioni
Tolentino counts the hamlets (frazioni) of Abbadia di Fiastra, Acquasalata, Ancaiano, Asinina, Bura, Calcavenaccio, Casa di Cristo, Casone, Cisterna, Collina, Colmaggiore, Divina Pastora, Fontajello, Fontebigoncio, Grazie, Maestà, Massaccio, Pace, Parruccia, Paterno, Pianarucci, Pianciano, Pianibianchi, Portanova, Rambona, Rancia, Regnano, Ributino, Riolante, Rofanello, Rosciano, Rotondo, Sant'Andrea, Sant'Angelo, San Bartolomeo, Santa Croce, San Diego, San Giovanni, San Giuseppe, Santa Lucia, San Martino, San Rocco, Salcito, Santissimo Redentore, Troiano, Vaglie and Vicigliano.

Economy
Tolentino is home to Arena, the swimwear brand, and Poltrona Frau, the noted designer of leather furniture and automotive interiors — as well as the Poltrona Frau Museum, designed by Italian architect Michele De Lucchi, to display furniture products.

Main sights
San Nicola Basilica Church
Castello della Rancia
Chiaravalle Abbey
Sacro Cuore di Gesù Church
San Catervo Church
San Francesco Church
Santa Maria della Tempesta Church
Santissimo Crocifisso Church
Teatro Nicola Vaccaj

Notable people
The most famous Tolentinati are St Nicholas of Tolentino (c. 1246–1305) and the humanist Francesco Filelfo (1398–1481). Other notable people:

 St Thomas of Tolentino, medieval Franciscan missionary and martyr
 Niccolò da Tolentino (1350c. 1435), mercenary
 Nicola Vaccai (1790–1848), musician
 Mario Mattoli (1898–1980), film director

Transport
There are bus lines from here to the nearby minor towns and villages and a railway leading from Civitanova to Fabriano.

See also
U.S. Tolentino

References

External links

 Tolentino official website
 tolentinoline.com
 Biennale dell'Umorismo nell'Arte
 Basilica of San Nicola da Tolentino
 Historical fair Tolentino 815

 
Cities and towns in the Marche